Cherapakura Chedevu is a 1955 Indian Telugu-language drama film, produced and directed by Kovelamudi Bhaskar Rao under the Bhaskar Productions banner. The film stars N. T. Rama Rao and Sowcar Janaki, with music composed by Ghantasala. It was dubbed in Tamil and released as Illarame Inbam in 1956.

Plot 
The story begins with Zamindar Govinda Rao (Ravulapalli) leading a happy family life with his wife Shantamma (Lakshmi Rajyam), son Anand (Amarnath), daughter-in-law Lalitha (Sowcar Janaki), daughter Seeta (Chandra Kumari), and son-in-law Pitambaram (Relangi). Once Govind Rao becomes terminally ill, so he gives a call to his first wife's son Mohan (N. T. Rama Rao) who left the home in childhood as Shantamma ill-treats him. Learning it, Shantamma conspires with a malevolent person Dayanidhi (R. Nageswara Rao) who has close frequency with their family. Both of them create a fake will and cleverly make a sign of Govind Rao. Parallelly, being cognizant of his father's condition Mohan immediately moves, on the way, he rescues a wise person Gangadharam (Doraiswamy) & his daughter Savitri (Pushpalata) from burglars but he is injured in that clash. By the time, he reaches home, Govind Rao passes away and Shantamma necks him out. Right now, Gangadharam asks Mohan to stay along with them where Savitri falls for him. On the other side, Dayanidhi ensnares Anand with a dancer Menaka (Raja Sulochana) and he starts neglecting Lalitha. Dayanidhi also ploys by sending Shantamma to pilgrimage and throwing Seeta & Pitambaram oot through Anand. Listening to the plight, Mohan decides to reform his brother, so, he joins as a driver at Menaka's house in disguise. Once Lalitha visits Menaka's house and requests her to get rid of her husband. Therein, she is badly humiliated when Anand comes to her rescue. At the same time, Shantamma returns and chides Anand, in that enrage, he slaps her. Grief-stricken, Shantamma leaves the house and meets with an accident. Here Mohan rescues her where she understands the virtue of Mohan. At present, Dayanidhi & Menaka intrigues Anand, overhearing it, and Lalitha saves her husband from harm. Eventually, Dayanidhi kidnaps Savitri when Mohan protects her and ceases the baddies. Finally, the entire family is reunited and the movie ends on a happy note with the marriage of Mohan & Savitri.

Cast 
N. T. Rama Rao as Mohan
Sowkar Janaki as Lalitha
Relangi as Pitambaram
R. Nageswara Rao as Dayanidhi
Amarnath as Anand
Doraiswamy as Gangadharam
Ravulapalli as Govind Rao
Suryakantham as Menaka's mother
Lakshmi Rajyam as Shanta
Rajasulochana as Menaka
Chandra Kumari as Seeta
Pushpalatha as Savitri

Soundtrack 

Music composed by Ghantasala. Music released by H.M.V. Audio Company. All the tunes for all the songs for both languages are the same.

Playback singers are Ghantasala, P. Leela, Jikki & K. Rani.

Tamil songs
Lyrics were by Thanjai N. Ramaiah Dass. Playback singers are Seerkazhi Govindarajan, P. Leela, Jikki & K. Rani.

References 

Indian drama films
Films scored by Ghantasala (musician)
1955 drama films